Danette Velasco Bataller (sometimes Danett, born c. 1980) is a Mexican woman from Mexico City, who after winning the title of Nuestra Belleza México, represented the country in the 1999 Miss World pageant, held in London, England, on December 4, 1999.

References

1980s births
Living people
Nuestra Belleza México winners
Miss World 1999 delegates
People from Mexico City